The 1988 World Sportscar Championship season was the 36th season of FIA World Sportscar Championship motor racing. It featured the 1988 FIA World Sports Prototype Championship which was open to FIA Group C and Group C2 cars and to IMSA GTP, GTX, GTO and GTU cars. The championship was contested over an eleven race series which ran from 6 March to 20 November 1988.

Martin Brundle was awarded the World Sports Prototype Championship for Drivers, Gordon Spice and Ray Bellm jointly won the FIA Cup for Group C2 Drivers, Silk Cut Jaguar was awarded the World Sports Prototype Championship for Teams and Spice Engineering won the FIA Cup for Group C2 Teams.

Schedule

Entries

Group C1

Group C2

IMSA GTP

Results and standings

Race results

In order to be classified for points, a team had to complete 90% of the winner's distance. Further, drivers were required to complete at least 30% of their car's total race distance to qualify for championship points. Drivers forfeited points if they drove in more than one car during the race. Group C2 drivers earned extra championship points for any finish within the overall top ten positions.

Drivers championships
The respective driver championships only counted each driver's seven highest scores toward the final championship total.  Points not counted toward the driver's tally are marked with parenthesis.

World Sports Prototype Championship for Drivers

FIA Cup for C2 Drivers

Teams championships

World Sports Prototype Championship for Teams

FIA Cup for C2 Teams

References

External links
 1988 World Sports-Prototype Championship

 
World Sportscar Championship seasons
Sports